九州 ("nine provinces") may refer to:

Kyushu, an island of Japan
Nine Provinces, an ancient division of China